Three ships of the Hellenic Navy have borne the name Lemnos or Limnos, named after the island of Lemnos and the First Balkan War Battle of Lemnos:

  (1914–1932), a Mississippi-class pre-dreadnought battleship
  (1943–1977), an LST1-class landing ship
  (1982–present), a Kortenaer/Elli-class frigate

Hellenic Navy ship names